Glenea atriceps is a species of beetle in the family Cerambycidae. It was described by Per Olof Christopher Aurivillius in 1911 and is known from Borneo and Malaysia. It contains the variety Glenea atriceps var. anticeimpunctata.

References

atriceps
Beetles described in 1911